Sikta Assembly constituency is an assembly constituency in Paschim Champaran district in the Indian state of Bihar.

Overview
As per orders of Delimitation of Parliamentary and Assembly constituencies Order, 2008, 9. Sikta Assembly constituency is composed of the following: Mainatanr and Sikta community development block; and Barawa Barauli, Somgarh and Bhavta gram panchayats of Narkatiaganj CD Block.

Sikta Assembly constituency is part of 1. Valmiki Nagar (Lok Sabha constituency).

Members of Legislative Assembly

Election results

2020

2015

2010

References

External links
 

Assembly constituencies of Bihar
Politics of West Champaran district